Anne Mette Samdal (born  in Trondheim) is a Norwegian wheelchair curler and ice sledge speed racer.

As an ice sledge speed racer she participated at the 1998 Winter Paralympic Games and won two gold medals at 100 m and 500 m LW11 event.

As a wheelchair curler she participated at the 2010 and 2014 Winter Paralympics. She is a  curler.

Wheelchair curling teams and events

References

External links 

Profile at the Official Website for the 2010 Winter Paralympics in Vancouver
Profile at the 2014 Winter Paralympics site

Living people
1971 births
Sportspeople from Trondheim
Norwegian female curlers
Norwegian wheelchair curlers
Paralympic wheelchair curlers of Norway
Wheelchair curlers at the 2010 Winter Paralympics
Wheelchair curlers at the 2014 Winter Paralympics
World wheelchair curling champions
Norwegian female speed skaters
Paralympic ice sledge speed racers of Norway
Ice sledge speed racers at the 1998 Winter Paralympics
Paralympic gold medalists for Norway
Medalists at the 1998 Winter Paralympics
Paralympic medalists in ice sledge speed racing